Herman the Recluse was, according to legend, a thirteenth century Benedictine monk best known as the supposed author of the Codex Gigas, or Devil's Bible.

The legend states that, as a resident of the Benedictine Monastery of Podlazice, Herman the Recluse was condemned to be walled up alive and starved to death. However, in a plea for his life, he convinced the Abbot to let him live if he could create a book that encapsulated all earthly knowledge in one night. Herman wrote until midnight, upon which he realized he could not finish his masterpiece, and sold his soul to a devil in exchange for the ability to finish the Codex Gigas.

Another version of the legend tells that after Herman was condemned for the unspecified sin, he persuaded the abbot to allow him a whole year to create the book. He worked day and night, and completed it once again after selling his soul to the devil

References

 National Geographic (2013) Devils Bible- documentary, part 1. 
 National Geographic (2013) Devils Bible- documentary, part 2. 

Czech Benedictines
13th-century Christian monks